Katochi is a village and a community in the municipal unit of Oiniades in Aetolia-Acarnania, West Greece, Greece. In 2011, it had a population of 2,829.

References

External links
Municipality of Oiniades 
Oiniades (municipality) on GTP Travel Pages
Ancient Oeniadae on GTP Travel Pages
Ancient Oeniadae access information
jstor.org, Oeniadae: I. History and Topography by Benjamin Powell, 1904

Populated places in Aetolia-Acarnania
Acarnania